Amblycheila is a genus of flightless, nocturnal tiger beetles. There are eight species distributed across the southwestern United States and Mexico.

Species
Amblycheila baroni Rivers, 1890 – montane giant tiger beetle
Amblycheila cylindriformis (Say, 1823) – Great Plains giant tiger beetle
Amblycheila halffteri Mateu, 1974
Amblycheila hoversoni Gage, 1990 – South Texas giant tiger beetle
Amblycheila katzi Roman & Duran, 2019
Amblycheila nyx Sumlin, 1991
Amblycheila picolominii Reiche, 1839 – plateau giant tiger beetle
Amblycheila schwarzi W. Horn, 1903 – Mojave giant tiger beetle

References

External links
Amblycheila. Integrated Taxonomic Information System (ITIS)

Cicindelidae
Beetles of North America